Julio Alarcón y Meléndez (1843–1924) was a Spanish priest, musician, poet and writer.

List of works
Collection of poems for youth.
Album of humor, or collection of stories, anecdotes, fables, jokes, dicharachos ... 1865.
The family album. (1865–1867 ). Literary weekly.
Loyalty to the test. 1886. The Glass.
The Azar. 1887 . Drama.
Guide particular traveler through all known and unknown countries. 1890.
St. Ignatius of Loyola as Castelar: Humorous refutation of opinions on San Ignacio expressed by Emilio Castelar in religious revolution.
No inn Andalusian piece. 1892.
Wild Europe: Explorations into the Social critique of modern civilization of the time.
Intentions. 1894. Three volumes.
A young, two feminisms and the aristocracy of heaven, dialogues in verse. 1901.
Joke and indeed, children's stories. 1901.
An acceptable feminism. 1902 . Study the work of Concepción Arenal.
More or less intentional fragments. 1902.
A great artist, 1910 . Biography Spanish violinist and composer Jesús de Monasterio, which Alarcon was a disciple.
Memories of memories. 1912 . Collection of poems in two parts: Feelings, his work of 1865 and memories of religious life with a foreword by Angel Maria Barcia.
The glorifying of the Sacred Heart of Jesus. 1912. Essay on spirit and virtues of Blessed Madeleine Sophie Barat.
An unknown celebrity. 1914 . Collection of articles previously published in Concepción Arenal magazine Reason and Faith.

Notable accolades
A street in Cordoba, his hometown, is named "Julio Alarcon" in his honor.

20th-century Spanish male writers
People from Córdoba, Spain
19th-century Spanish Jesuits
20th-century Spanish Jesuits
1843 births
1924 deaths
Spanish musicians
20th-century Spanish poets
Spanish biographers
Male biographers
20th-century biographers
Spanish male poets
19th-century male writers